The Copa Sudamericana is an annual football cup competition organized by CONMEBOL since 2002 for football club in South American.

Over the past nine tournaments, twelve players have been the top scorers of the Copa Sudamericana. No person has ever repeated as the top scorers. Argentine players have been the top scorers four times, the most of any other country. Pierre Webó is the only non-South American to be a top scorer. The all-time top scorer is Eduardo Vargas, who scored all eleven of his goals in 2011.

By tournament

External links

Topscorers
Copa Sudamericana